Bais (Gallo: Baès) is a commune in the Ille-et-Vilaine department in Brittany in northwestern France. The writer Anne de Tourville (1910–2004), winner of the 1951 Prix Femina, was born in Bais.

Population

Inhabitants of Bais are called Baiséens in French.

Sights
Gallo-Roman remains have been discovered that date from the first century AD.

The church of Saint Mars was built primarily in the 16th century, with expansion in the 19th century. It is dedicated to Saint Mars, bishop of Nantes in the sixth century, who became a hermit in the neighboring village of Marsé.

See also
Communes of the Ille-et-Vilaine department

References

External links

Official website 
 Cultural Heritage 
Mayors of Ille-et-Vilaine Association 

Communes of Ille-et-Vilaine